Slovakia-United States relations are bilateral relations held between the United States and the Slovak Republic, particularly since the latter's independence in 1993. According to the 2012 U.S. Global Leadership Report, 27% of Slovaks approve of U.S. leadership, with 32% disapproving and 41% uncertain.

History 

The fall of the socialist regime in Czechoslovakia in 1989 and the subsequent split of the two republics on January 1, 1993, allowed for renewed cooperation between the United States and Slovakia. The election of a pro-Western, reformist government in late 1998 further boosted close ties between the countries.  The United States delivered more than $200 million after 1990 to support the rebuilding of a healthy democracy and market economy in Slovakia, primarily through programs administered by the U.S. Agency for International Development (USAID). Slovakia and the United States retain strong diplomatic ties and cooperate in the military and law enforcement areas. The U.S. Department of Defense programs have contributed significantly to Slovak military reforms.

Hundreds of thousands of Americans have their roots in Slovakia, and many retain strong cultural and familial ties to the Slovak Republic. President Woodrow Wilson and the United States played a major role in the establishment of the original Czechoslovak state on October 28, 1918, and President Wilson's Fourteen Points were the basis for the union of the Czechs and Slovaks. Tomas Masaryk, the father of the Czechoslovak state and its first president, visited the United States during World War I and used the U.S. Constitution as a model for the first Czechoslovak Constitution.

Principal U.S. Embassy Officials include:
 Charge D' Affaires—Keith Eddins
 Political/Economic Chief—Susan Ball
 Economic Officer—William Taliaferro
 Commercial Officer—David Ponsar
 Consular Officer—Simon Hankinson
 Management Officer—Tess Moore
 Public Affairs Officer—Chris Scharf
 General Services Officer—Andrew P. Hogenboom
 Defense Attaché—LTC Matthew Atkins
 Office of Defense Cooperation—LTC John DuMond

The United States maintains an embassy in Bratislava, Slovakia.

Military
On 8 June 2003, in support of the United States-led Multi-National Force – Iraq, eighty-five Slovak military engineers were sent to Iraq. They were stationed at Camp Echo, near Al Diwaniyah, and primarily took part in anti-mining operations. In 2004, Slovakia became a member of NATO.

American soldiers entered Slovak territory in 2015 as they traversed Slovakia to reach Hungary in order to take part in a military exercise, named Brave Warrior. In October 2016, Slovakia hosted a military training exercise, named Slovak Shield, which included military forces from the United States, as well as soldiers from the Czech Republic, Poland, and Hungary.

See also 

 Slovak Americans

References

External links
 History of Slovakia - U.S. relations
 http://slovakia.usembassy.gov/index.html

 
Bilateral relations of the United States
United States